Carrie Ashton Johnson (Ashton; August 24, 1863 – March 3, 1949) was an American suffragist, editor, and author. Through her writing, she was involved in the suffrage and temperance movements of the day. Johnson was affiliated with the Illinois Woman's Press Association for five decades. She was also a co-founder of the Children's Home of Rockford, Illinois. Johnson died in 1949.

Early life and education
Carrie May Ashton was born in Durand, Illinois, August 24, 1863. Her parents were Andrew, a dry goods merchant, and Mary A. Ashton. She had a sister, Bertha, and a brother, Willard.

When she was fifteen years old, her parents moved to Rockford, where she attended the high school and private schools for several years. Then she took a course in the business college and was graduated there.

Career

On November 27, 1889, she married Harry Melancthon Johnson, managing editor of the Rockford Morning Star. He went on to become the owner of the Rockford Republican. She was an active member of the Young Woman's Christian Temperance Union (WCTU) and of the Equal Suffrage Association. She served as State secretary of the Illinois Equal Suffrage Association in the early 1890s. In 1889, she published Glimpses of Sunshine, a volume of sketches and quotations on suffrage work and workers. She was a contributor to the Cottage Hearth, the Housewife, Table Talk, the Ladies' Home Companion, the Household, the Housekeeper, the Modern Priscilla, Godey's Magazine, Home Magazine, the Decorator and Furnisher, Interior Decorator, and other journals. She wrote mainly on domestic topics, interior decorations, suffrage and temperance subjects.

For more than three years, Johnson was in charge of the woman's department of the Farmer's Voice, of Chicago, called "The Bureau for Better Halves," and afterwards conducted a like page for the Spectator, a family magazine published in Rockford. After Harry's death, January 19, 1928, the widow and her sons, Willard Ashton Johnson and Donald B. Johnson, held ownership of the Republican, until 1928, when they sold it to Ruth Hanna McCormick. In 1940, she was honored for her fifty-year membership in the Illinois Woman's Press Association.

Personal life
In 1889, she married Harry Melancthon Johnson. The Johnsons made their home in Rockford. She died in Rockford, March 3, 1949. Interment was at Willwood Burial Park, Rockford.

References

Attribution

External links
 

1863 births
1949 deaths
19th-century American newspaper editors
19th-century American writers
19th-century American women writers
People from Winnebago County, Illinois
Editors of Illinois newspapers
American suffragists
Woman's Christian Temperance Union people
American feminists
Wikipedia articles incorporating text from A Woman of the Century